Elysius superba is a moth of the family Erebidae. It was described by Herbert Druce in 1884. It is found in Mexico, Costa Rica and Panama.

References

superba
Moths described in 1884
Moths of North America